Cheam railway station serves Cheam in the London Borough of Sutton. It is located on the Sutton & Mole Valley Lines section from Sutton to Epsom with trains to London Victoria and London Bridge both via Mitcham Junction and West Croydon.

Location
Cheam Railway station is located between Cheam Village and South Cheam. This is approximately 200 meters south of Cheam High Street (A232), near its junction with the A217. The railway goes under the A217 (Belmont Rise) at the eastern end of the station.

History
In 1844 Cheam was on the planned route for the London to Portsmouth atmospheric railway. The section of line between Croydon and Epsom was part of the London & Croydon Railway company who promoted the Clegg and Samuda atmospheric principle, utilizing a  pipe. This project failed, and Cheam station became part of the London, Brighton and South Coast Railway on 10 May 1847.

The station is almost 16 miles (26 km) from London Bridge station. Over the years Cheam station expanded, and was rebuilt and the rail bed widened in preparation for the installation of AC overhead electric services, which would have included the building of an additional central platform island. Due to the outbreak of the First World War, the full planned expansion was cancelled and was never completed. Nevertheless, the through lines were still in place until 1978 after the Bognor Regis and Portsmouth express services were withdrawn from the Sutton and Dorking route to serve an expanding . The wide space between the tracks still remains and shows where the fast lines had been laid prior their removal.  The brick main buildings are on the down side of the station.

Services
All services at Cheam are operated by Southern using  EMUs.

The typical off-peak service in trains per hour is:

 2 tph to  via 
 2 tph to  via 
 2 tph to 

On Saturday evenings (after approximately 18:45) and on Sundays, there is no service south of Dorking to Horsham.

Connections
London Buses route 470 serves the station.

References

External links

Southern E-Group's page with pictures

Railway stations in the London Borough of Sutton
Former London, Brighton and South Coast Railway stations
Railway stations in Great Britain opened in 1847
Railway stations served by Govia Thameslink Railway